Alenka Orel (born 14 March 1977) is a Slovenian sailor. She competed in the women's 470 event at the 1996 Summer Olympics.

References

External links
 

1977 births
Living people
Slovenian female sailors (sport)
Olympic sailors of Slovenia
Sailors at the 1996 Summer Olympics – 470
People from Izola